Size 14 was an American rock band in the late 1990s based out of Hollywood that gained some notoriety with the novelty song "Claire Danes Poster".  This song appeared on the Dude, Where's My Car? soundtrack; other Size 14 songs appeared on movies such as Sugar & Spice, 100 Girls, and 100 Women. They released one self-titled album on Volcano Entertainment in 1997.

Size 14 started after Linus of Hollywood answered an ad placed by bassist Robt Ptak in Recycler magazine looking for a lead or rhythm guitarist. Initially Ptak and Linus listened to each other's tracks, and decided to work on the demos Linus brought to the table. They demoed all the material on Ptak's 8-track.  Linus then pulled in his roommate Kevin Danczak to play guitar for Size 14. Drummer Dave Armstrong initially moved to Los Angeles to be in Ptak's solo project Artificial Joy; Armstrong recorded drum tracks for some of this material. (Artificial Joy would later become a full live band when Ptak moved to New York City.)  Ptak then asked Armstrong to join Size 14 as their drummer. Linus stated in an interview that the track "Rollin in the 510" was about Kevin's old car. In addition to "Claire Danes Poster", they also had two other minor hits in "Power Bottom" and "Space Docking". Size 14's sound came from Linus being influenced at the time by bands such as Ridel High, Shufflepuck, That Dog, and Weezer.

Album

Their only studio album, Size 14 was released in 1997. All songs were produced by Mike Clink

Track listing

Breakup

Ptak was replaced by bassist Ray Santangelo for a short West coast tour before Size 14 officially disbanded in early 1998 after the band's record label, Volcano Entertainment went out of business.

After leaving Size 14, Ptak played with The Bastard Kings of Rock, and managed the band Pin Me Down.

Guitarist Danczak played guitar and bass in Captain Genius from 2002 to 2007; the band released two albums.

Singer Linus of Hollywood has released three solo albums.  he is one half of the band Jarinus, plays guitar and keyboard in Nerf Herder, and runs Crappy Records with Jaret Reddick of Bowling for Soup. Linus is also involved in producing and songwriting for other bands such as Allstar Weekend, Bowling For Soup, and The Charlatans.

Linus released his fourth solo album in 2014 titled Something Good via the Pledgemusic platform.

Discography
Size 14 (1997)

Personnel

Band members
 Linus Of Hollywood – guitar, vocals,
 Robt Ptak – bass, backing vocals
 Dave Armstrong – drums, percussion
 Kevin Danczak – guitar

References

External links 
  Size 14 Official Facebook Page run by Bassist Robt Ptak
 

American power pop groups
Alternative rock groups from California
Indie rock musical groups from California
Volcano Entertainment artists
1995 establishments in California
Musical groups established in 1995
Musical groups from Los Angeles